

Result of municipal elections
Results of the 1967 municipal elections.

References

Local elections in Norway
1960s elections in Norway
Norway
Local